The 2014 Florida gubernatorial election took place on November 4, 2014, to elect the Governor and Lieutenant Governor of Florida.

The incumbent Republican, Rick Scott, ran for reelection. The Democratic nominee was former governor Charlie Crist, who was Scott's direct predecessor. Crist was elected governor as a Republican in 2006 but did not run for re-election in 2010, instead opting to run for Senate as an independent. Libertarian nominee Adrian Wyllie and several candidates with no party affiliation also ran. Political pundits considered the race a toss-up.

On Election Day, Scott defeated Crist, earning 48% of the vote. With a margin of 1%, this election was the closest race of the 2014 gubernatorial election cycle.

Republican primary

Candidates

Declared
 Yinka Adeshina, pharmacist
 Elizabeth Cuevas-Neunder, conservative activist and candidate for governor in 1998
 Rick Scott, incumbent governor

Withdrew
 Timothy Devine

Declined
 Jeff Atwater, Chief Financial Officer of Florida (running for re-election)
 Pam Bondi, Florida Attorney General (running for re-election)
 Bill McCollum, former Florida attorney general and candidate for governor in 2010
 Adam Putnam, Florida Commissioner of Agriculture (running for re-election)
 John E. Thrasher, state senator
 Will Weatherford, Speaker of the Florida House of Representatives
 Allen West, former U.S. Representative

Endorsements

Polling

Results

Democratic primary
In April 2010 and while still in office as Governor of Florida, Charlie Crist left the Republican Party to run for U.S. Senate as an Independent. He was defeated in the general election by Republican nominee Marco Rubio. In December 2012, Crist joined the Democratic Party.

Candidates

Declared
 Charlie Crist, former Republican turned Independent Governor and independent candidate for the U.S. Senate in 2010
 Nan Rich, former Minority Leader of the Florida Senate

Withdrew
 Farid Khavari, economist, author and Independent candidate for governor in 2010 (running as an Independent)

Declined
 Bob Buckhorn, Mayor of Tampa and former Tampa city councilman
 Manny Diaz, former mayor of Miami
 Buddy Dyer, Mayor of Orlando, former Minority Leader of the Florida Senate and nominee for Florida Attorney General in 2002
 Dan Gelber, former Minority Leader of the Florida House of Representatives, former state senator and nominee for Florida Attorney General in 2010
 Pam Iorio, former Mayor of Tampa, former Hillsborough County Supervisor of Elections and former Hillsborough County Commissioner
 Bill Nelson, U.S. Senator
 Jeremy Ring, state senator
 Alex Sink, former Chief Financial Officer of Florida, nominee for governor in 2010 and nominee for Florida's 13th congressional district in 2014
 Rod Smith, former chairman of the Florida Democratic Party, former state senator and nominee for lieutenant governor in 2010
 Debbie Wasserman Schultz, U.S. Representative and chair of the Democratic National Committee

Endorsements

Polling

Results

Libertarian Party

Candidates

Declared
 Adrian Wyllie, activist, radio host and former chairman of the Libertarian Party of Florida

Withdrew
 John Wayne Smith, activist and perennial candidate

Declined
 Alexander George, former committeeman of the Libertarian Party of Florida and Republican candidate for the U.S. Senate in 2012 (ran as an Independent, then withdrew)
 Steve LaBianca, activist and businessman
 Roger Stone, political consultant, lobbyist and strategist

Independents

Candidates

Declared
 Glenn Burkett, businessman and perennial candidate
 Farid Khavari, economist, author and independent candidate for governor in 2010

Withdrew
 Alexander George, former committeeman of the Libertarian Party of Florida and Republican candidate for the U.S. Senate in 2012

Disqualified
 Joe Allen, writer

Write-in candidates
 Piotr Blass
 Running mate: Bob Wirengard
 Timothy Michael Devine
 Running mate: Diane Smith
 Emelia Sandra Harris
 Running mate: Georgianna G. Harris
 Monroe Lee
 Running mate: Juanita Lockett
 Caleb Pringle
 Running mate: Jeffery Lunsford
 Charles Frederick Tolbert
 Running mate: Christine Timmon

General election

Candidates
The following candidates appeared on the ballot for the general election:
 Rick Scott (Republican), incumbent governor
 Running mate: Carlos Lopez-Cantera, incumbent lieutenant governor
 Charlie Crist (Democratic), former Republican-turned-independent governor and independent candidate for the U.S. Senate in 2010
 Running mate: Annette Taddeo-Goldstein, former chair of the Miami-Dade County Democratic Party and nominee for Florida's 18th congressional district in 2008
 Adrian Wyllie (Libertarian), activist, radio host and former chairman of the Libertarian Party of Florida
 Running mate: Greg Roe, insurance executive
 Glenn Burkett (Independent), businessman and perennial candidate
 Running mate: Jose Augusto Matos
 Farid Khavari (Independent), economist, author and independent candidate for governor in 2010
 Running mate: Lateresa A. Jones

Endorsements

Campaign
As of early June 2014, Scott had spent almost $13m since March on television advertisements attacking Charlie Crist, who then appeared the likely Democratic nominee. Although the ads resulted in a tightening of the race, this came about by decreasing Crist's favorability ratings. By contrast, Scott's favorability ratings did not increase. By late September, Scott's television ad spending had exceeded $35m and in mid-October it reached $56.5 million, compared to $26.5 million by Crist. On October 22 it was reported that Scott's total spending had exceeded $83 million and he announced that, having previously said he would not do so, he would be investing his own money into the campaign, speculated to be as much as $22 million.

Crist hoped to draw strong support from Florida's more than 1.6 million registered black voters, an effort that was challenging with regards to his previous political career as a Republican. A poll conducted in September 2014 by Quinnipiac University revealed his support among black voters was at 72 percent against Scott, which was below the 90 percent analysts believed he needed to win.

Scott and Crist met in a debate on October 15, held by the Florida Press Association at Broward College. The debate required candidates to receive at least 15% support in major polls to be included.  This was allegedly increased from 10% after Wyllie met the initial criteria, but the Miami Herald reported that the threshold had been 15% since 2013. The decision has been criticised as "suppressing choice" and the Wyllie campaign has filed a lawsuit to be included in the debate. U.S. District Judge James I. Cohn dismissed the lawsuit. At this debate, Scott refused to take the stage for seven minutes because Crist had a small electric fan under his lectern. The incident was dubbed "fangate" by media sources such as Politico.

Debates
Complete video of debate, October 15, 2014 - C-SPAN
Complete video of debate, October 21, 2014 - C-SPAN

Predictions

Polling

With Scott

With Putnam

Results
Scott defeated Crist by a slim margin garnering 48% percent of the vote to the former's 47%. With the loss, Crist became the first candidate in Florida history to lose statewide elections as a Democrat, as a Republican, and as an Independent.

See also
 List of governors of Florida
 2014 United States gubernatorial elections

References

External links
Florida gubernatorial election, 2014 at Ballotpedia
Charlie Crist for Governor
Rick Scott for Governor
Adrian Wyllie for Governor
Khavari for Governor

2014
Florida
Gubernatorial